Reema Malhotra (born 17 October 1980) is an Indian former cricketer who played as a right-handed batter and right-arm leg break bowler. She appeared in one Test match, 41 One Day Internationals and 22 Twenty20 Internationals for India between 2003 and 2013. She played domestic cricket for Delhi, Railways and Assam.

References

External links
 
 

1980 births
Living people
Cricketers from Delhi
Indian women cricketers
India women Test cricketers
India women One Day International cricketers
India women Twenty20 International cricketers
Delhi women cricketers
Railways women cricketers
Assam women cricketers
North Zone women cricketers
Central Zone women cricketers
East Zone women cricketers